{{DISPLAYTITLE:Lambda2 Sculptoris}}

Lambda2 Sculptoris is an orange-hued star in the southern constellation of Sculptor. On dark nights it is faintly visible to the naked eye, having an apparent visual magnitude of +5.90. Based upon an annual parallax shift of 9.63 mas as measured from Earth, it is located roughly 340 light-years from the Sun.

At an age of about 3.58 billion years, Lambda2 Sculptoris is an evolved red-clump giant star with a stellar classification of K0 III. It is presently on the horizontal branch and is generating energy through the nuclear fusion of helium at its core. The star has an estimated 1.49 times the mass of the Sun and has expanded to about 14 times the Sun's radius.

References

K-type giants
Horizontal-branch stars
Sculptoris, Lambda-2
Sculptor (constellation)
004211
003456
0195
Durchmusterung objects